Baseball Hall of Fame balloting may refer to:

National Baseball Hall of Fame and Museum
 The general selection process for National Baseball Hall of Fame and Museum
 The selection process for the National Baseball Hall of Fame and Museum in a given year:

 1936 Baseball Hall of Fame balloting
 1937 Baseball Hall of Fame balloting
 1938 Baseball Hall of Fame balloting
 1939 Baseball Hall of Fame balloting
 1942 Baseball Hall of Fame balloting
 1944 Baseball Hall of Fame balloting
 1945 Baseball Hall of Fame balloting
 1946 Baseball Hall of Fame balloting
 1947 Baseball Hall of Fame balloting
 1948 Baseball Hall of Fame balloting
 1949 Baseball Hall of Fame balloting
 1950 Baseball Hall of Fame balloting
 1951 Baseball Hall of Fame balloting
 1952 Baseball Hall of Fame balloting
 1953 Baseball Hall of Fame balloting
 1954 Baseball Hall of Fame balloting
 1955 Baseball Hall of Fame balloting
 1956 Baseball Hall of Fame balloting
 1957 Baseball Hall of Fame balloting
 1958 Baseball Hall of Fame balloting
 1959 Baseball Hall of Fame balloting
 1960 Baseball Hall of Fame balloting
 1961 Baseball Hall of Fame balloting
 1962 Baseball Hall of Fame balloting
 1963 Baseball Hall of Fame balloting
 1964 Baseball Hall of Fame balloting
 1965 Baseball Hall of Fame balloting
 1966 Baseball Hall of Fame balloting

 1967 Baseball Hall of Fame balloting
 1968 Baseball Hall of Fame balloting
 1969 Baseball Hall of Fame balloting
 1970 Baseball Hall of Fame balloting
 1971 Baseball Hall of Fame balloting
 1972 Baseball Hall of Fame balloting
 1973 Baseball Hall of Fame balloting
 1974 Baseball Hall of Fame balloting
 1975 Baseball Hall of Fame balloting
 1976 Baseball Hall of Fame balloting
 1977 Baseball Hall of Fame balloting
 1978 Baseball Hall of Fame balloting
 1979 Baseball Hall of Fame balloting
 1980 Baseball Hall of Fame balloting
 1981 Baseball Hall of Fame balloting
 1982 Baseball Hall of Fame balloting
 1983 Baseball Hall of Fame balloting
 1984 Baseball Hall of Fame balloting
 1985 Baseball Hall of Fame balloting
 1986 Baseball Hall of Fame balloting
 1987 Baseball Hall of Fame balloting
 1988 Baseball Hall of Fame balloting
 1989 Baseball Hall of Fame balloting
 1990 Baseball Hall of Fame balloting
 1991 Baseball Hall of Fame balloting
 1992 Baseball Hall of Fame balloting
 1993 Baseball Hall of Fame balloting
 1994 Baseball Hall of Fame balloting

 1995 Baseball Hall of Fame balloting
 1996 Baseball Hall of Fame balloting
 1997 Baseball Hall of Fame balloting
 1998 Baseball Hall of Fame balloting
 1999 Baseball Hall of Fame balloting
 2000 Baseball Hall of Fame balloting
 2001 Baseball Hall of Fame balloting
 2002 Baseball Hall of Fame balloting
 2003 Baseball Hall of Fame balloting
 2004 Baseball Hall of Fame balloting
 2005 Baseball Hall of Fame balloting
 2006 Baseball Hall of Fame balloting
 2007 Baseball Hall of Fame balloting
 2008 Baseball Hall of Fame balloting
 2009 Baseball Hall of Fame balloting
 2010 Baseball Hall of Fame balloting
 2011 Baseball Hall of Fame balloting
 2012 Baseball Hall of Fame balloting
 2013 Baseball Hall of Fame balloting
 2014 Baseball Hall of Fame balloting
 2015 Baseball Hall of Fame balloting
 2016 Baseball Hall of Fame balloting
 2017 Baseball Hall of Fame balloting
 2018 Baseball Hall of Fame balloting
 2019 Baseball Hall of Fame balloting
 2020 Baseball Hall of Fame balloting
 2021 Baseball Hall of Fame balloting
 2022 Baseball Hall of Fame balloting

 2023 Baseball Hall of Fame balloting

Other
The general selection process for the Canadian Baseball Hall of Fame
The general selection process for National College Baseball Hall of Fame

See also
Japanese Baseball Hall of Fame